Malan River is a river in Gujarat, in western India, which originates in the Mordhara hills. Its basin has a maximum length of 44 km. The total catchment area of the basin is 332 km2.

References

Rivers of Gujarat
Rivers of India